A Name for Evil is a 1973 American horror film directed by Bernard Girard and starring Samantha Eggar and Robert Culp.

Plot
Dissatisfied with the family architectural business, a man and his wife pack up and move out to his great-grandfather's old house in the country. While trying to patch it up, the house starts to make it clear to him that it doesn't want him there, but the local church (with some off-kilter practices of their own) seems to take a shine to him...

Cast 
Samantha Eggar as Joanna Blake
Robert Culp as John Blake
Sheila Sullivan as Luanna Baxter
Mike Lane as  Fats
Sue Hathaway as  Mary
Ted Greenhalgh as Hugh

Release
The film was released theatrically in the United States by Cinerama Releasing Corporation in 1973.

The film was released on VHS in the U.S. by Paragon Video Productions in the 1984.

See also
 List of American films of 1973

References
Horror and science fiction films II by Donald C. Willis

theconsummateculp.com/a-name-for-evil/

1973 films
1973 horror films
American supernatural horror films
Films scored by Dominic Frontiere
Cinerama Releasing Corporation films
1970s English-language films
Films directed by Bernard Girard
1970s American films